Hamad Al-Harbi (Arabic:حمد الحربي) (born 30 January 1995) is a Qatari footballer .

External links

References

Qatari footballers
1995 births
Living people
Al-Gharafa SC players
Al-Sailiya SC players
Al-Khor SC players
Al-Arabi SC (Qatar) players
Al-Shamal SC players
Lusail SC players
Qatar Stars League players
Qatari Second Division players
Association football defenders